List of United Kingdom MPs with the shortest service is an annotated list of the Members of the United Kingdom Parliament since 1900 having total service of less than 365 days.

Nominal service is the number of days elapsed between the Declaration (or deemed election) and the date of death, defeat, disqualification, resignation, etc.

Effective service is the number of days elapsed between taking the Oath as a Member of Parliament (if the Member did so) and the date of death, resignation, disqualification or dissolution of Parliament. In other words, this number is the maximum number of days the Member could have sat in Parliament, whether or not they actually did so.

List

See also
Records of members of parliament of the United Kingdom
United Kingdom general election records
United Kingdom by-election records
List of Stewards of the Manor of Northstead
List of UK parliamentary election petitions
List of Welsh AMs/MSs with the shortest service
List of members of the United States House of Representatives who served a single term

Notes

References

External links
Maiden Speeches, 1979 Onwards – Parliament Information list
Maiden Speeches, 1945–-1979 – Parliament Information list
Hansard – Millbank Systems

United Kingdom MPs
Shortest service